Petrov nad Desnou (until 1955 Petrovice nad Desnou) is a municipality and village in Šumperk District in the Olomouc Region of the Czech Republic. It has about 1,200 inhabitants.

Administrative parts
The village of Terezín is an administrative part of Petrov nad Desnou.

Geography
It lies in the Hanušovice Highlands. It is situated at the confluence of the Desná and Merta rivers.

History
The first written mention of Petrov nad Desnou is from 1354. From 1980 to 2009, it was part of Sobotín. On 1 January 2010 Petrov nad Desnou became a separate municipality.

References

Villages in Šumperk District